St Michael the Archangel's Church, Halam is a Grade I listed parish church in the Church of England in Halam, Nottinghamshire.

History

St Michael's Church Halam is a Norman church, dating from the 12th century, and has some fine examples of stained glass, in particular the 15th-century medieval 'Adam and Eve’ window located in the chancel. It was restored from 1884 to 1889.
It has a lovely Norman chancel arch much praised by Nicholas Pevsner.

The church is in a joint parish with St Giles' Church, Edingley.

Organ

The church contains a pipe organ installed in 2010 by Jonathan Wallace of Henry Groves & Son.  A specification of the organ can be found on the National Pipe Organ Register.

References

Church of England church buildings in Nottinghamshire
Grade I listed churches in Nottinghamshire
12th-century church buildings in England